Prince of Biscari is a title in the Kingdom of Sicily, held by the head of one branch of the House of Paternò, a major Sicilian noble family, originally a cadet branch of the House of Barcelona-Aragona.

The title was created by the grant of a Letters Patent from King Philip IV of Spain on 21 June 1633, which was bestowed upon the Baron of Biscari, Don Agatino Paternó Castello.

He is known chiefly for having raised the fief of Biscari out of the marshy valleys subject to deadly malaria and for marrying the daughter of the Baron Vincenzo Paternó Castello.

Agatino did not succeed to the title of baron or prince. He married the heiress of Vincenzo Paternó Castello, named Maria la Restia, and accordingly for their culture and times, assumed the rank and style of the first Prince of Biscari.

Their great-grandson, named Vincenzo, would become known for having restored the town, and especially the castle, after severe earthquake damage in 1693.

In 1938, the town of Biscari changed its name to Acate.

Coat of arms 
The coat of arms displayed by the princes of Biscari is: Royal arms of Aragon differenced by a bendlet azure (Or, four pallets gules overall a bendlet azure) (House of Paternò), impaling the canting arms of Castello: Azure, a castle double-towered argent supported by two dragons.

Lords of Biscari 
 Matteo Mazzone – 1408 (creation)
 Bernardo Caprera – 1410
 Antonio del Castello – 1416
 Corrado – 1453
 Gutierrez – 1465
 Guglielmo – 1479
 Giovanello (grandson of) – 1528
 Vincenzo – 1555
 Ferdinando – 1566

Lords of Biscari (House of Paternò), 1578
 Orazio Paternó Castello (son of Giovanello and Francesca del Castello) – 1578

Barons of Biscari (House of Paternò, 1604) 
 Francesco Paternó Castello – 1604
 Vincenzo Paternó Castello (brother of) – 1609

Princes of Biscari (House of Paternò), 1633

 Agatino Paternò-Castello, 1st prince of Biscari since 1633 (1594–1675)
 Vincenzo Paternò-Castello, 2nd prince of Biscari (1630–1675)
 Ignazio Paternò-Castello, 3rd prince of Biscari (1651–1700)
 Vincenzo Paternò-Castello, 4th prince of (1685–1749)
 Ignazio Paternò-Castello, 5th prince of Biscari (1719–1786)
 Vincenzo Paternò-Castello, 6th prince of Biscari (1743–1813)
 Ignazio Paternò-Castello, 7th prince of Biscari (1781–1844)
 Roberto Vincenzo Paternò-Castello, 8th prince of Biscari (1790–1857)
 Francesco Vincenzo Paternò-Castello, 9th prince of Biscari (1816–1867)
 Roberto Vincenzo Paternò-Castello, 10th prince of Biscari (1860–1930)
 Roberto Vincenzo Paternò-Castello, (cugino del precedente), 11th prince of Biscari (1872–1947)
Giuseppe Paternò-Castello, 12th prince of Biscari (1908–...)
Ignazio Paternò-Castello, 13th prince of Biscari (1913–...)
Roberto Paternò-Castello, 14th prince of Biscari (1945– living)

Footnotes 

Biscari
1633 establishments in the Spanish Empire